Wayne Hammond is the name of

 Wayne Hammond (field hockey) (born 1948), Australian field hockey player
 Wayne G. Hammond (born 1953), Tolkien scholar
 Wayne Hammond, Resiliency Expert Mental Health